Dezra's Quest is a fantasy novel by Chris Pierson, set in the world of Dragonlance, which is based on the Dungeons & Dragons fantasy role-playing game.

Plot summary
Dark Wood is the home of Ansalon's centaur tribes, where they dwelt in peace, until strife began tearing them apart. A brave young warrior named Trephas sets out for Solace to seek aid from Caramon Majere and his daughter Dezra against a mad chieftain.

Reception

References

1999 American novels
American fantasy novels
Dragonlance novels